The UCLA women's volleyball program began its first year in 1965. Andy Banachowski was the head coach each year since 1965 until his retirement after the 2009 season, with the exception of the two seasons of 1968–69 and 1969–70, after he graduated from UCLA. In those seasons, Mardi Hardy Monroe was the head coach. Michael Sealy took over as head coach in 2010 and led the team to a national championship in 2011.

Banachowski had more wins than any other NCAA Division I women's volleyball coach, with a record (since 1970, since no records were kept from 1965 to 1969) of 1,106–301. Banachowski had led UCLA to six national championships (3 NCAA–1984, 1990, 1991; 2 AIAW–1974, 1975; and 1 DGWS–1972). UCLA has made 27 of 28 NCAA tournaments and has made 11 NCAA Final Fours, which is tied with Nebraska as the second most Final Four appearances of all Division I programs.

NCAA championships

1984
UCLA claimed the program's first NCAA national title (fourth overall) after four previous runner-up finishes following the team's 1975 AIAW title. In the deciding fifth game against Stanford, UCLA was down 12–4, but with heroics from Liz Masakayan, the Bruins continued to chip away at the lead before earning match point at 14–13. Masakayan had the final kill to give UCLA the 15–13 win.

1990
UCLA won the NCAA title  by defeating Pacific 15–9, 15–12, 15–7. UCLA was led by Natalie Williams and Marissa Hatchett who had 12 kills a piece. The Bruins finished the 1990 season 36–1.

1991

Playing at Pauley Pavilion, the Bruins repeated as NCAA champions by defeating Long Beach State in five games. After losing the first two games by the scores of 15–12, 15–13, UCLA completed off a huge comeback to take the next three games, 15–12, 15–6, 15–11.

UCLA's comebacks was one of the biggest in NCAA history, since this match, no team had ever before rallied from 2 games to 0 to win in five games in the NCAA national championship. UCLA finished their season 31–5

2011

After 20 years, the UCLA Bruins captured their fourth NCAA title and seventh overall by defeating Illinois 3–1 on December 17, 2011, at the Alamodome in San Antonio, Texas. The Bruins were seeded ninth in the NCAA championship tournament. On their way to the title game, they defeated 4-time defending champions Penn State and No. 1 seeded Texas to face No. 3 seeded Illinois. Rachael Kidder was named the most outstanding player of the tournament. Lauren Van Orden and Zoe Nightingale were also named to the all tournament team. Head coach Michael Sealy became a champion both as a player and a head coach. The women's volleyball team was featured in the new Pac-12 Networks Promo for the 2012 season.

Season-by-season results

Note: No records were kept until the 1970–71 season.

The three seasons from 1965–1968 and 40 seasons from 1970–2009 were coached by Andy Banachowski.

Conference History
1974–1975: Southern California Women's Intercollegiate Athletic Conference
1976–1984: Western Collegiate Athletic Association
1985: PacWest Conference
1986–present: Pac-12 Conference

Olympians
Former players who have gone to the Olympic Games to play or coach.

Players
Laurie Lewis – 1968 (indoor)
Jeanne (Beauprey) Reeves – 1984 (indoor)
Liz Masakayan – 1988 (indoor)
Elaine Youngs – 1996 (indoor), 2004 & 2008 (beach)
Holly McPeak – 1996, 2000, & 2004 (beach)
Linda (Robertson) Handley – 1996 (beach)
Annett Davis – 2000 (beach)
Jenny Johnson Jordan – 2000 (beach)
Elisabeth Bachman – 2004 (indoor)
Coaches
Jeanne (Beauprey) Reeves – 1996 (assistant coach)
Liz Masakayan – 2004 & 2008 (Coach of McPeak/Youngs beach volleyball team)

Postseason

The UCLA Bruins have an NCAA Division I Tournament record of 90–32 through thirty-five appearances.

See also
List of NCAA Division I women's volleyball programs

References

External links
 

 
Women's sports in California
1965 establishments in California
Volleyball clubs established in 1965